Outcasts or Outcast, in comics, may refer to:

 Outcasts (DC Comics), series by John Wagner and Alan Grant
 Outcasts, several different characters published in Marvel Comics, see list of Marvel Comics teams and organizations
 Outcast by Kirkman and Azaceta, 2014 comic book
 The Outcast, original English-language manga published by Seven Seas Entertainment

See also
Outcast (disambiguation)